Dolores Dorn (March 3, 1934 – October 5, 2019) was an American film and television actress, who was the co-star of The Bounty Hunter (1954), Uncle Vanya (1957), Underworld U.S.A. (1961),  and several other films through 1985. On Broadway, she was billed as Dolores Dorn-Heft.

Early years
Dolores M. Heft was born in Chicago, the daughter of an automobile dealer. A graduate of the Goodman Art Theatre in Chicago, she finished third in the Miss Chicago contest in 1950 and second in the same contest in 1951.

Stage
Before appearing in films, Dorn acted with the Shaffner Players in Illinois, Iowa, and Missouri. She appeared in Hide and Seek (1957) on Broadway and in the off-Broadway production Between Two Thieves.

Film
Dorn had second billing in The Bounty Hunter, a Western starring Randolph Scott, in which her character, Julie Spencer, ends up married to Scott's. She played the wife of Alan Ladd in the actor's last Hollywood film in which he played a leading-man role, 13 West Street, and was featured as Cuddles, the moll of convict Cliff Robertson, in the crime film Underworld, U.S.A.

Television
Dorn appeared in a number of made-for-TV films and as a guest star in series such as Ironside, Charlie's Angels, Simon & Simon, Run for Your Life, and The Untouchables.

Additional filmography

Teaching
Dorn became an acting teacher with the American Film Institute in 1977 and later with the Lee Strasberg Institute.

Personal life
Dorn was married to actors Franchot Tone (1956–1959), and Ben Piazza (1967–1979).  She died on October 5, 2019, at the age of 85.

Dorn's name is featured on the Tony Award's "In Memoriam 2020" list.

References

External links

 
 
 

1934 births
2019 deaths
Actresses from Chicago
American film actresses
American stage actresses
20th-century American actresses
21st-century American women